Woolverton Manor is one of three manor houses, along with Northcourt Manor and Westcourt Manor, just outside Shorwell, on the Isle of Wight, England.

Woolverton lies on the farther side of the clear stream that ripples from Shorwell to Brighstone. It has, of course, its distinctive entry in the Great Roll:— Isd. Wills, ten. Ulwarcombe et Luran de eo. Ipse tenuit in paragio de rege E. Tc. e. mo. se defd. p. una hida. Tra. e. i car. et ibi e. cu. uno villo. et ii bord. et molin. de xxxv den. et dim. ac. pti. Val. et valuit x solid. (William, son of Stur, holds Ulwarcombe, and Luran of him. He himself held it in abeyance of King Edward. Then and now assessed at one hide. The land is one carucate, and there are one villein, two borderers, a mill at 35 denarii, and half an acre of pasturage. Worth ten shillings.)

The owners of this manor afterwards assumed the surname of Woolverton—apparently, a corruption of Ulwar—and one Ralph de Woolverton contributed a quota of two bowmen, and Nicholas one bowman, to the defence of the Island. Sir Ralph de Woolverton gave the tithes of his demesne to the priory of Carisbrooke, but the manor afterwards passed into the Dineley or Dingley family. I may here observe that Elizabeth, daughter of one John Dingley, married, in 1571, Sir John Leigh, then a youthful gentleman, 25 years old. I cannot help thinking that this marriage led to Sir John's purchase of Noith Court, which was probably effected about ten years later. In the reign of Etizabeth, the manor of Woolverton is said to have contained three hundred acres. At the Revolution, it was purchased by Maurice Hunt and Anthony Morgan, Esqrs. The manor house and principal farm afterwards passed into the hands of Jolliffe, Delgarno, and Archdeacon successively; and the remainder into the hands of Serle, Goodenough, and Clarke. The farm house contains some tolerable carvings of the time of James I.

References
 This article includes text incorporated from William Henry Davenport Adams' "The history, topography, and antiquities of the isle of Wight (1856)", a publication now in the public domain.

Country houses on the Isle of Wight
Manor houses in England